Enrique "Kike" García Feijoó (born 15 December 1982) is a Venezuelan football manager and former player who played as a midfielder. He is the current manager of Deportivo La Guaira.

Playing career
Born in Caracas, García joined C.S. Colegio San Agustín El Paraíso in 1986 at the age of three. In 2001, aged 18, he signed for Caracas, and made his first team debut with the club in the following year.

In 2005, after a short periods at Marítimo de Margarita and Aragua, García returned to Caracas. He moved back to Aragua in the middle of 2005, establishing himself as a starter and winning the Copa Venezuela in 2008.

García signed for Estrella Roja for the 2008–09 season, but signed for Mineros de Guayana in January 2009. In 2010, he agreed to a deal with Real Esppor, and retired with the club in the end of the year, aged 28.

Managerial career
Shortly after retiring, García took up coaching in his first team San Agustín. He subsequently moved to Atlético Venezuela, being an assistant manager of the main squad and manager of the under-20s.

On 29 November 2015, García was appointed manager of Deportivo Petare for the ensuing campaign. The following 23 May, he was named in charge of Lebanese club Al Nabi Chit SC.

García returned to his home country on 28 November 2018, after being appointed at the helm of former side Aragua. He resigned on 8 May 2021, after a poor start of the campaign.

García was named manager of Carabobo on 2 January 2022, but was sacked on 4 July. On 20 November, he was appointed in charge of Deportivo La Guaira for the 2023 season.

References

External links

1982 births
Living people
Footballers from Caracas
Venezuelan footballers
Association football midfielders
Venezuelan Primera División players
Venezuelan Segunda División players
Caracas FC players
Aragua FC players
A.C.C.D. Mineros de Guayana players
Deportivo La Guaira players
Venezuelan football managers
Venezuelan Primera División managers
Deportivo Miranda F.C. managers
Aragua F.C. managers
Carabobo F.C. managers
Al Nabi Chit SC managers
Venezuelan expatriate football managers
Expatriate football managers in Lebanon
Deportivo La Guaira managers